Cuyan (?–?)The leader of Jianzhou Nüzhen(建州女真) in the Ming Dynasty. His family name is Aisin Gioro(愛新覺羅), his name was translated as Cheuk Yan(綽顏). He was born in Hetuala(赫圖阿拉).<ref name= Nurhaci's fifth generation grand uncle.

History 
The second son of Mengtemu, Cungšan's brother.<ref name= In 1433, when his father and his brother Agu were killed by Mutahu in Seven Surnames of the Savages (七姓野人), Cuyan and his brother Cungšan were attached to their uncle Fanca. In 1446, the Ming Dynasty seal Cuyan for fuqianhu of Jianzhou Left Defense (建州左衛). The birth and death is unknown, "Draft History of Qing" (清史稿) recorded in the early death.

Family

Father 
Mengtemu(孟特穆)

Brother 
Agu(阿古)
Cungšan(充善)

Nephew 
Tolo(妥羅)
Toimo(妥義謨)
Sibeoci Fiyanggū(錫寶齊篇古)

Bibliography 
"Draft History of Qing" (清史稿)/Volume 1
The same book/Volume 161
The same book/Volume 222

Notes 

Jurchens in Ming dynasty